Leela Chess Zero (abbreviated as LCZero, lc0) is a free, open-source, and deep neural network–based chess engine and volunteer computing project. Development has been spearheaded by programmer Gary Linscott, who is also a developer for the Stockfish chess engine. Leela Chess Zero was adapted from the Leela Zero Go engine, which in turn was based on Google's AlphaGo Zero project. One of the purposes of Leela Chess Zero was to verify the methods in the AlphaZero paper as applied to the game of chess.

Like Leela Zero and AlphaGo Zero, Leela Chess Zero starts with no intrinsic chess-specific knowledge other than the basic rules of the game. Leela Chess Zero then learns how to play chess by reinforcement learning from repeated self-play, using a distributed computing network coordinated at the Leela Chess Zero website.

As of December 2022, Leela Chess Zero has played over 1.5 billion games against itself, playing around 1 million games every day, and is capable of play at a level that is comparable with Stockfish, the leading conventional chess program.

History
The Leela Chess Zero project was first announced on TalkChess.com on January 9, 2018. This revealed Leela Chess Zero as the open-source, self-learning chess engine it would come to be known as, with a goal of creating a strong chess engine. Within the first few months of training, Leela Chess Zero had already reached the Grandmaster level, surpassing the strength of early releases of Rybka, Stockfish, and Komodo, despite evaluating orders of magnitude fewer positions due to its deep neural network in its evaluation function and its use of Monte Carlo tree search.

In December 2018, the AlphaZero team published a new paper in Science magazine revealing previously undisclosed details of the architecture and training parameters used for AlphaZero. These changes were soon incorporated into Leela Chess Zero and increased both its strength and training efficiency.

The work on Leela Chess Zero has informed the similar AobaZero project for shogi.

The engine has been rewritten and carefully iterated upon since its inception, and now runs on multiple backends, allowing it to effectively utilize different types of hardware, both CPU and GPU.

The engine supports the Fischer Random Chess variant, and a network is being trained to test the viability of such a network as of May 2020.

Program and use 
The method used by its designers to make Leela Chess Zero self-learn and play chess at above human level is reinforcement learning. This is a machine-learning algorithm, mirrored from AlphaZero used by the Leela Chess Zero training executable/binary code (called "binary") to maximize reward through self-play. As an open-source distributed computing project, volunteer users run Leela Chess Zero to play hundreds of millions of games which are fed to the reinforcement algorithm. In order to contribute to the advancement of the Leela Chess Zero engine, the latest non-release candidate (non-rc) version of the Engine as well as the Client must be downloaded. The Client is needed to connect to the current server of Leela Chess Zero, where all of the information from the self-play chess games are stored, to obtain the latest network, generate self-play games, and upload the training data back to the server.

In order to play against the Leela Chess Zero engine on a machine, two components are needed: the engine binary and a network. (The engine binary is distinct from the client, in that the client is used as a training platform for the engine). The network contains Leela Chess Zero's evaluation function that is needed to evaluate positions. Older networks can also be downloaded and used by placing those networks in the folder with the Lc0 binary.

Self-play Elo

Self-play Elo is used to gauge relative network strength to look for anomalies and general changes in network strength, and can be used as a diagnostic tool when Lc0 undergoes significant changes. Through test match games that are played with minimal temperature-based variation, Lc0 engine clients test the most recent version against other recent versions of the same network's run, which is then sent to the training server to create an overall Elo assessment.

Standard Elo formulae are used to calculate relative Elo strength between the two players. More recent Self-play Elo calculations use match game results against multiple network versions to calculate a more accurate Elo value.

The Self-play approach has several consequences on gauging Lc0 Elo rating:

Initial Cumulative Elo inflation in training runs differ drastically due to a-periodic gains in self-improvement and adversarial play.
Measuring Elo relative to previous networks fails to measure general strength since networks are trained to anticipate and beat the predictions made by prior Lc0 networks rather than opponents outside the training domain. This is a type of overfitting measured most drastically when testing smaller networks.
There is no direct one-to-one correlation between self-play Elo and the strength against Alpha-Beta engines, and no known correlation to strength against humans.
Input training data has a significant effect on how a network will perform elo-wise against the next iteration.
Cumulative Self-Play Elo does not have a universal conversion to conventional Human Elo due to inflation issues presented by adversarial play, and the reliance of the measure on time control. This holds true even when the engine runs on a standard set of initial conditions.

Cumulative Self-Play Elo inflation can be compared with other runs to gauge the lack of generality in gauging strength with pure cumulative self-play elo. The Fischer Random Chess run Test 71.4 (named 714xxx nets), ranks at nearly 4000 cumulative self-play Elo 76 nets into its run (714076). The T60 (6xxxx) run 63000 net has a cumulative self-play Elo of around 2900. Pitting 714076 against net 63000 reveals 63000 clearly beats 714076 in head-to-head matches at most, if not all "fair" time controls. 4000 Elo >> 2900 elo, but the net with 2900 Elo is clearly beating the 4000 Elo net. This alone is enough to credit the claim that Cumulative self-play Elo is not an objective measure of strength, nor is it a measure which allows one to linearly compare Lc0 network strength to Human strength.

Setting up the engine to play a single node with --minibatch-size=1 and go nodes 1 for each played move creates deterministic play, and Self-Play Elo on such settings will always yield the same result between 2 of the same networks on the same start position—always win, always loss, or always draw. Self-play Elo is not reliable for determining strength in these deterministic circumstances.

Spinoffs
In season 15 of the Top Chess Engine Championship, the engine AllieStein competed alongside Leela. AllieStein is a combination of two different spinoffs from Leela: Allie, which uses the same evaluation network as Leela, but has a unique search algorithm for exploring different lines of play, and Stein, an evaluation network which has been trained using supervised learning based on existing game data featuring other engines (as opposed to the unsupervised learning which Leela uses). While neither of these projects would be admitted to TCEC separately due to their similarity to Leela, the combination of Allie's search algorithm with the Stein network, called AllieStein, is unique enough to warrant it competing alongside mainstream Lc0. (The TCEC rules require that a neural network-based engine has at least two unique components out of three essential features: The code that evaluates a network, the network itself, and the search algorithm. While AllieStein uses the same code to evaluate its network as Lc0, since the other two components are fresh, AllieStein is considered a distinct engine.)

In early 2021, the LcZero blog announced Ceres, a new chess engine that uses LcZero networks. It implements Monte Carlo tree search as well as many novel algorithmic improvement ideas. Initial Elo testing showed that Ceres is stronger than Lc0 with the same network.

Competition results
In April 2018, Leela Chess Zero became the first engine using a deep neural network to enter the Top Chess Engine Championship (TCEC), during season 12 in the lowest division, division 4. Leela did not perform well: in 28 games, it won one, drew two, and lost the remainder; its sole victory came from a position in which its opponent, Scorpio 2.82, crashed in three moves. However, it improved quickly. In July 2018, Leela placed seventh out of eight competitors at the 2018 World Computer Chess Championship. In August 2018, it won division 4 of TCEC season 13 with a record of 14 wins, 12 draws, and 2 losses. In Division 3, Leela scored 16/28 points, finishing third behind Ethereal, which scored 22.5/28 points, and Arasan on tiebreak.

By September 2018, Leela had become competitive with the strongest engines in the world. In the 2018 Chess.com Computer Chess Championship (CCCC), Leela placed fifth out of 24 entrants. The top eight engines advanced to round 2, where Leela placed fourth. Leela then won the 30-game match against Komodo to secure third place in the tournament. Leela participated in the "TCEC cup", a event in which engines from different TCEC divisions can play matches against one another. Leela defeated higher-division engines Laser, Ethereal and Fire before finally being eliminated by Stockfish in the semi-finals.

In October and November 2018, Leela participated in the Chess.com Computer Chess Championship Blitz Battle. Leela finished third behind Stockfish and Komodo.

In December 2018, Leela participated in season 14 of the Top Chess Engine Championship. Leela dominated divisions 3, 2, and 1, easily finishing first in all of them. In the premier division, Stockfish dominated while Houdini, Komodo and Leela competed for second place. It came down to a final-round game where Leela needed to hold Stockfish to a draw with black to finish second ahead of Komodo. It successfully managed this and therefore competed in the superfinal against Stockfish. Whilst many expected Stockfish to win comfortably, Leela exceeded all expectations and scored several impressive wins, eventually losing the superfinal by the narrowest of margins in a 49.5–50.5 final score.

In February 2019, Leela scored its first major tournament win when it defeated Houdini in the final of the second TCEC cup. Leela did not lose a game the entire tournament. In April 2019, Leela won the Chess.com Computer Chess Championship 7: Blitz Bonanza, becoming the first neural-network project to take the title.

In the season 15 of the Top Chess Engine Championship (May 2019), Leela defended its TCEC cup title, this time defeating Stockfish in the final 5.5–4.5 (+2 =7 -1) after Stockfish blundered a seven-man tablebase draw. Leela also won the Superfinal for the first time, scoring 53.5–46.5 (+14 -7 =79) versus Stockfish, including winning as both white and black in the same predetermined opening in games 61 and 62.

Season 16 of TCEC saw Leela finish in third place in premier division, missing qualification for the superfinal to Stockfish and new deep neural network engine AllieStein. Leela did not suffer any losses in the Premier division, the only engine to do so, and defeated Stockfish in one of the six games they played. However, Leela only managed to score nine wins, while AllieStein and Stockfish both scored 14 wins. This inability to defeat weaker engines led to Leela finishing third, half a point behind AllieStein and a point behind Stockfish. In the fourth TCEC cup, Leela was seeded first as the defending champion, which placed it on the opposite half of the brackets as AllieStein and Stockfish. Leela was able to qualify for the finals, where it faced Stockfish. After seven draws, Stockfish won the eighth game to win the match.

In Season 17 of TCEC, held in January–April 2020, Leela regained the championship by defeating Stockfish 52.5–47.5, scoring a remarkable six wins in the final ten games, including winning as both white and black in the same predetermined opening in games 95 and 96. It qualified for the superfinal again in Season 18, but this time was defeated by Stockfish 53.5–46.5. In the TCEC Cup 6 final, Leela lost to AllieStein, finishing second.

Season 19 of TCEC saw Leela qualify for the superfinal again. This time it played against a new Stockfish version with support for NNUE, a shallow neural network–based evaluation function used primarily for the leaf nodes of the search tree. It defeated Leela convincingly with a final score of 54.5–45.5 (+18 -9 =73). Since then, Leela has  qualified three times for the superfinal, only to lose every time to Stockfish: +14 -8 =78 in Season 20, +19 -7 =74 in Season 21 and +27 -10 =63 in Season 23.

Results summary

Notable games
 Leela vs Stockfish, CCCC bonus games, 1–0 Leela beats the world champion Stockfish engine despite a one-pawn handicap.
Stockfish vs Leela Chess Zero – TCEC S15 Superfinal – Game 61 Leela completely outplayed Stockfish with black pieces in Trompovsky attack, Leela's eval went from 0.1 to −1.2 in one move, and Stockfish's eval did not go negative until 15 moves later.

References

External links

Leela Chess Zero on GitHub
Neural network training client
Engine
Neural nets
Chessprogramming wiki on Leela Chess Zero

Chess engines
Free and open-source software
Volunteer computing projects
2018 software
Applied machine learning